SoundSpel is a regular and mostly phonemic English-language spelling reform proposal. It uses a 26-letter alphabet that is fully compatible with QWERTY keyboards. Though SoundSpel was originally based on American English, it can represent dialectal pronunciation, including British English. With roots extending as far back as 1910 but largely complete by 1986, SoundSpel was developed "in response to the widely held conviction that English spelling is more complex than it needs to be." The American Literacy Council has endorsed the reform because anglophones can easily read it. Additionally, according to its proponents, "[SoundSpel] is fully compatible with traditional spelling and can be mixed with it in any proportion desired."

History

In 1910, philologist Alexander John Ellis played a major role in developing an English-language spelling system now known as "Classic New Spelling". Walter Ripman and William Archer wrote the system's first dictionary, New Spelling (NuSpelling), which was republished in 1941 by the Simplified Spelling Society.

In the early 1960s, Sir James Pitman developed the Initial Teaching Alphabet, which would become one of SoundSpel's predecessors.

In 1969, Godfrey Dewey improved upon Ripman's and Archer's work, producing World English Spelling. Dewey and Edward Rondthaler, a prominent typesetter and CEO of the International Typeface Corporation, corresponded from 1971.

In 1986, the American Language Academy published the Dictionary of Simplified American Spelling, a book written by Rondthaler and Edward Lias. It calls for the improvement of English spelling, with clearer rules and better grapheme/phoneme correspondence. Its guidelines are less strictly phonemic than Classic New Spelling.

The system was further reformed from 1987 on and became SoundSpel.

Description

Phonetics
Spellings here are matched to their sounds using the International Phonetic Alphabet (IPA). SoundSpel examples are accompanied by traditional spellings in italics if different. Note that writings in SoundSpel may not follow these tables exactly due to their time of writing or the author's personal preferences. These tables also do not account for proper nouns (which are discussed under "Exceptions").

Rules

SoundSpel has changed slightly over time. Listed below are generally the most recent guidelines. Obsolete or optional rules are also listed. Furthermore, the system is not a fait accompli. The Dictionary of Simplified American Spelling reads: "[F]urther fine tuning [of SoundSpel] is [now] appropriate. Recommendations are welcome from all—phoneticians, linguists, educators, publishers, those with a special interest in the subject, and, very importantly, the public at large."

False diphthongs
With three or more vowel letters, the syllable ends with the first digraph.

Hyphens and syllable breaks
Hyphens separate adjacent letters that can be mistaken for digraphs. Beyond these examples and those double consonants following  (like in fall and cross), all double consonants surround a syllable break. Additionally, double consonants often represent geminates.

Following a prefix, a hyphen indicates that a vowel is long (co-ed, re-arm, bi-lateral). Any adjacent preceding vowel is also long (bio-, neo-).

Schwa and schwi

First,  is used in a word's first syllable (event;  for 'equip'). Using  terminally in monosyllabic words such as bee and see (instead of ) and their derivatives is discouraged.

SoundSpel retains the spellings of schwers (a portmanteau of schwa and ). This is for two reasons. First, the reform's "immediate goal... is to reflect a word's full pronunciation", and second, these words' derivatives often contain the syllable's stressed equivalent (as in victor and victorious), so keeping the old spelling is useful for maintaining aesthetic relationships.

Exceptions

Capitalization and proper nouns
The word I, like in traditional spelling, remains capitalized. The word U, a respelling of you, is also capitalized. As Edward Rondthaler wrote: "Since we accept the flattery of capital I for 'me', let us extend the courtesy of capital U for 'you'." In SoundSpel's 1978 form, however, neither I nor U were capitalized.

SoundSpel retains the spellings of proper nouns to the extent that these are the names of living people, functional institutions, government agencies, brand names, and so on. If both the visual recognition of a name and its correct pronunciation are important, the latter will be given in SoundSpel but in square brackets [ ]. Foreign words that are too awkward to be converted to SoundSpel are represented in italics. Otherwise, most well known proper nouns may be written in SoundSpel. Naturally, SoundSpel dictionaries may use SoundSpel to indicate an irregular proper noun's pronunciation, and months and days of the week may also be respelled.

Pluralization
Neither the plural suffix  (as in jobs), the possessive suffix  (as in man's), nor the third-person present singular verb suffix  (as in he runs) are changed, even though in all these cases the  may be pronounced  at times. This exception is a break from the Dictionary of Simplified American Spelling, in which plurals were spelled on a strictly phonetic basis ( and  respectively). This follows (formal) traditional spelling.

Features
Does not introduce any symbols foreign to English like diacritics or ligatures.

Does not dramatically change the appearance of existing words (i.e., through the use of non-Latin letters), and generally decreases text length by about 4%. SoundSpel also promotes more precise pronunciation in speech.

Removes many doubled letters made redundant under the reform, and has virtually no silent letters.

Generally not intended to differentiate homophones, as "context takes care of everything [in speech, and therefore writing]." However, as writing is matched with speech, many homographs differentiate, such as 'read', which becomes reed (present tense) and red (past tense).

Improves consistency of writing, thereby reducing learning time and reading difficulties compared to traditional English spelling. However, compromises and rule exceptions make SoundSpel more difficult than it would be if it were a purely phonemic system.

Text examples
Note that any given example may not exactly follow this article's guidelines due to its time of writing, the author's personal preferences, or the author's (eye) dialect.

 by H. G. Wells
 [657 characters]

(It was on the first day of the new year the announcement was made, almost simultaneously from three observatories, that the motion of the planet Neptune, the outermost of all planets that wheel around the sun, had become very erratic. A retardation in its velocity had been suspected in December. Then a faint, remote speck of light was discovered in the region of the perturbed planet. At first this did not cause any very great excitement. Scientific people, however, found the intelligence remarkable enough, even before it became known that the new body was rapidly growing larger and brighter, and that its motion was quiet different from the orderly progress of the planets.) [680 characters]

 by Frank Kermode
 [668 characters]

(We may nowadays be chary about using the word ‘genius’, but we still have a good idea what is meant by it. For example, there are great numbers of very gifted musicians who are admired but not called geniuses. But there are others manifestly prodigious, performing, often at extraordinarily early ages, a variety of feats so complex that the musical layman could hardly imagine, even with the most desperate labour, accomplishing any one of them, while even musicians are astonished: and we then reach for the good, handy, vague Enlightenment word and call them geniuses. The list includes Mozart and Mendelssohn; and, despite all the limiting judgments, it includes Benjamin Britten.'') [684 characters]

See also

 
List of reforms of the English language
Reforms of French orthography
German orthography reform of 1996
English orthography
English spelling-to-sound correspondences
Orthography
Spelling reform
Defective script
"The Chaos" (poem demonstrating irregular English spelling)
Ghoti
English IPA help
International Phonetic Alphabet
Linguistic conservatism
Linguistic prescription
Traditional Spelling Revised

Notes

References

External links
"Simplified Spelling," translator extension
English Spelling Society website
American Literacy Council website

English spelling reform